Bed Hostesses (German: Die Bett-Hostessen) is a 1973 West German-Swiss sex comedy film directed by Erwin C. Dietrich and starring Ingrid Steeger, Karin Hofmann and Christa Free.

Cast
Ingrid Steeger as Hostess at Cyclist Carlo 
Karin Hofmann as Ev'chen - the forest fairy
Christa Free as Ilona 
Monica Marc as Nurse Angelika 
Kurt Meinicke as Ilona's lover and 'Bunny'
Kenita Flynn
Carlo Monti as Carlo Salvatore - the cyclist 
Christian van Bergen as one of the rangers
Max Crottet
Rolf Häubi as Ernesto 
Roman Huber
Jürg Coray as County Court bailiff 
Fritz Steinmann
Yuma Streiff
Raphael Britten as Oberarzt Adolar 
Britt Corvin as Maxi

References

External links

1970s sex comedy films
German sex comedy films
West German films
Films directed by Erwin C. Dietrich
Swiss comedy films
1970s German-language films
1970s German films